Troubled Laughter is a 1979 Chinese drama film directed by Yang Yanjin and Deng Yimin, set in the Cultural Revolution. The film stars Li Zhiyu as Fu Bin, a powerless newspaper writer who struggles with his conscience during an age of pervasive dishonesty and immorality from the top on down. It was screened out of competition at the 1981 Cannes Film Festival.

Cast
Li Zhiyu as Fu Bin, a writer working for the Haicheng Daily
Pan Hong as Fu Bin's devoted wife, a schoolteacher
Gong Fei as Fu Bin's young daughter
Shi Jiufeng as Fu Bin's colleague and old acquaintance
Cheng Zhi as Haicheng Daily's chief editor, an ass-kisser
Yuan Yue as Song Abao, Haicheng's Communist Party secretary, a scheming lowlife
Bai Mu as disgraced professor of surgery
Qiao Qi as Fu Bin's former professor in journalism
Qin Yi as the wife of Fu Bin's former professor, a former actress
Fu Hengzhi as failing medical student-turned-heartless hospital leader
Qiu Shisui as a sympathizing doctor
Hong Zhaosen as secretary

References

External links

1979 films
1970s Mandarin-language films
1979 drama films
Films about the Cultural Revolution
Films shot in Shanghai
Shanghai Film Studio films
Chinese drama films